"Shoot Your Shot" is a single by American performance artist Divine, released in 1982. The song also appeared on Divine's first album, Jungle Jezebel (titled My First Album in some territories), in 1982 and was later reissued on the 1984 compilation album The Story So Far.

Chart performance
"Shoot Your Shot" became Divine's second single to chart on the Dutch Top 40 after "Native Love (Step By Step)".  It debuted at #26 and eventually peaked at #3. The song spent a total of 10 weeks on the chart. "Shoot Your Shot" was certified gold (100,000 copies) in the Netherlands.

Cover versions 
This song was covered by Dutch Electroformation Image Transmission in the '90s and by German artist Ringo in 1986.

Track listings
Dutch CD maxi single
 "Shoot Your Shot (Radio Version)" - 4:08
 "Shoot Your Shot (Special Extended Version)" - 6:24
 "Shoot Your Shot (12-Inch Version)" - 8:06

U.S. 12-inch vinyl single
 "Shoot Your Shot (Dance Mix)" - 6:31
 "Jungle Jezebel (Dance Mix)" - 4:47

Charts

References

1983 singles
Disco songs
Divine (performer) songs
1983 songs
Songs written by Bobby Orlando
Song recordings produced by Bobby Orlando